= Pipaliya Rani =

- village
- Location within Madhya Pradesh Location within India
- Coordinates: 23.109907°N 77.499273°E
- Country: India
- State: Madhya Pradesh
- District: Bhopal
- Tehsil: Huzur

Population (2011)
  - Total: 303
- Time zone: UTC+5:30 (IST)
- ISO 3166 code: MP-IN
- Census code: 482533

Pipaliya Rani is a village in the Bhopal district of Madhya Pradesh, India. It is located in the Huzur tehsil and the Phanda block. The Kaliasot River and the National Highway 12 pass through the village.

== Demographics ==
According to the 2011 census of India, Pipaliya Rani has 65 households. The effective literacy rate (i.e. the literacy rate of population excluding children aged 6 and below) is 66.53%.

Demographics (2011 Census)
	Total	Male	Female
Population	303	161	142
Children aged below 6 years	61	34	27
Scheduled caste	17	8	9
Scheduled tribe	15	10	5
Literates	161	93	68
Workers (all)	102	88	14
Main workers (total)	79	75	4
Main workers: Cultivators	16	16	0
Main workers: Agricultural labourers	5	5	0
Main workers: Household industry workers	2	2	0
Main workers: Other	56	52	4
Marginal workers (total)	23	13	10
Marginal workers: Cultivators	8	6	2
Marginal workers: Agricultural labourers	8	2	6
Marginal workers: Household industry workers	1	0	1
Marginal workers: Others	6	5	1
Non-workers	201	73	128
